3rd Politburo may refer to:
3rd Central Bureau of the Chinese Communist Party
3rd Politburo of the Communist Party of Cuba
3rd Politburo of the Party of Labour of Albania
3rd Politburo of the Communist Party of Czechoslovakia
3rd Politburo of the Socialist Unity Party of Germany
3rd Politburo of the Polish United Workers' Party
3rd Politburo of the Romanian Communist Party
3rd Politburo of the Lao People's Revolutionary Party
3rd Politburo of the Workers' Party of Vietnam
3rd Politburo of the Communist Party of Yugoslavia
3rd Politburo of the Hungarian Communist Party
3rd Standing Committee of the Workers' Party of Korea